Norwood Carlton Tilley Jr. (born December 16, 1943) is a senior United States district judge of the United States District Court for the Middle District of North Carolina.

Education and career

Born in Rock Hill, South Carolina, Tilley received a Bachelor of Science degree from Wake Forest University in 1966 and a Juris Doctor from Wake Forest University School of Law in 1969. He was a law clerk for Judge Eugene Andrew Gordon of the United States District Court for the Middle District of North Carolina from 1969 to 1971. He was an Assistant United States Attorney of the Middle District of North Carolina from 1971 to 1974. He was the United States Attorney for the Middle District of North Carolina from 1974 to 1977. He was in private practice in Greensboro, North Carolina from 1977 to 1988.

Federal judicial service

Tilley was nominated by President Ronald Reagan on April 26, 1988, to a seat on the United States District Court for the Middle District of North Carolina vacated by Judge Hiram Hamilton Ward. He was confirmed by the United States Senate on October 14, 1988, and received his commission on October 17, 1988. He served as Chief Judge from 1999 to 2006. He assumed senior status on December 16, 2008.

References

Sources
 

1943 births
Living people
Assistant United States Attorneys
Judges of the United States District Court for the Middle District of North Carolina
United States Attorneys for the Middle District of North Carolina
United States district court judges appointed by Ronald Reagan
20th-century American judges
Wake Forest University alumni
Wake Forest University School of Law alumni
21st-century American judges